Lamine Moro (born 13 February 1994) is a Ghanaian professional footballer who plays as a defender.

Early life

Moro Lamine was born in Accra, Ghana. He began his junior career in West African Football Academy and elaborated his skills there during all his junior career. When was 15 years old, he began his professional career in the Ghanean Football Sekondi Hasaacas Football Club.

Playing career

Club
Youth Career
 2007-2009: West African Football Academy, Ghana

Senior Career

 Loan 2009-2010: Sekondi Hasaacas Football Club, Ghana
 2010-2012: West African Football Academy, Ghana
 2012-2013: Nadi Al-Quwa Al-Jawiya Al-Riyadh, Iraq
 2013-2016: Liberty Professionals FC, Ghana
 Loan 2014-2015: Union Sportive Orléans Loiret Football, France
 2016-2019 : Buildcon FC, Zambia (47 matches,3 goals)
 2019-     : Young Africans S.C, Tanzania

Real Kashmir 
In October 2022, I-League club Real Kashmir confirmed the signing of Moro, on a one-year deal. On 13 November, he made his professional debut in India, playing for Real Kashmir in the I-League against NEROCA, winning 1–0. Six days later, he scored his first goal for the club against Rajasthan United, in a 2–0 win.

International 
 Ghana U-20 (11 match, 0 goal)

Career statistics

Club

References

Living people
1994 births
Ghanaian footballers
Association football defenders
Liberty Professionals F.C. players
Real Kashmir FC players